Alfredo Tomasini (24 June 1964 – 8 December 1987) was a Peruvian football player.

Nicknamed el Tanque Blanco, Tomasini was a forward for the club Sporting Cristal between 1985 and 1986 and Alianza Lima, until 1987 when he died in an airplane crash known as the 1987 Alianza Lima air disaster. He survived the initial crash but due to a broken leg was not able to stay afloat. His body was never recovered.

Tomasini was also an expert swimmer graduated from the British Markham College.

References

1964 births
1987 deaths
Peruvian people of Italian descent
Peruvian footballers
Sporting Cristal footballers
Club Alianza Lima footballers
Victims of aviation accidents or incidents in Peru
Association football forwards
Footballers killed in the 1987 Alianza Lima plane crash